Quasimoto is a side project of hip hop producer Madlib, from Oxnard, California. Quasimoto is composed of Madlib and his animated alter ego Lord Quas. Lord Quas is known for his high-pitched voice, which often interacts with Madlib's regular voice. Quasimoto was conceived one day in the studio, when Madlib decided to rap to his own beats. Madlib did not like the sound of his voice (his friends in Oxnard call him "Barry White" in reference to his deep voice), so he decided to slow his recorder down, rap slowly, then speed the recording back up to produce Lord Quas' distinctive high-pitched sound. Quasimoto's lyrics frequently address themes such as violence and drug use in a comedic fashion, and the character of Lord Quas has been interpreted as a satirical take on gangsta-rap.

History
Peanut Butter Wolf, DJ and owner of Stones Throw Records, heard Quas' demo tapes and encouraged Madlib to release more tracks under this alias. Quasimoto was featured on Wolf's My Vinyl Weighs a Ton album in 1998, on the song "Styles Crews Flows Beats". Later, Madlib put out Quasimoto's debut album, The Unseen, in 2000. This album received much praise from underground fans and from mainstream media, making it onto Spin Magazine's top albums of the year list.

Madlib's original idea for his character was to make him an "unknown person or entity", hence the title of Quasimoto's debut album, The Unseen. While the character was depicted as a humanoid white figure on The Unseen's album cover, the appearance of the character was changed after fans started identifying him as a creature on the cover of single Microphone Mathematics.

After the release of The Unseen, Madlib spent the next few years working on different projects such as Yesterdays New Quintet and his album Shades of Blue. Quas re-emerged in 2003, making a few guest appearances, notably on Jaylib's Champion Sound and  Madvillain's Madvillainy (Madlib and MF DOOM). Quasimoto officially returned with the vinyl-only Bus Ride EP in 2005, continuing his distinctive style of high pitched rhymes and unorthodox samples.

In 2005, Quasimoto dropped The Further Adventures of Lord Quas which featured M.E.D. and MF DOOM. The album cover features a reference to Frank Zappa's debut album, Freak Out!, a picture of super-producer J Dilla, and a picture of Wild Man Fischer, who is also referenced in one of the songs. The voice of Melvin Van Peebles is sampled on several tracks from both albums.

In June 2013 they released the compilation album Yessir Whatever, a collection of 12 tracks made over a roughly 12-year period. Some tracks were released on rare and out-of-print vinyls while others were previously unreleased, being mixed and mastered for the first time specifically for the compilation.

In 2016, Quasimoto announced an album and tour the next year via a post from their Instagram. However, as of 2023, no album has been released.

Influences
In an interview, Madlib said that the atmosphere and sound on the Quasimoto albums owe much to the work of Alain Goraguer on the soundtrack of La Planète sauvage. An early Quasimoto video features excerpts from the film, and the song "Come on Feet" contains a sample from its soundtrack.

Discography

Studio albums
 The Unseen (2000)
 The Further Adventures of Lord Quas (2005)

Compilation albums
 Yessir Whatever (2013)

Singles
 "Hittin' Hooks" (1999)
 "Microphone Mathematics" (1999)
 "Basic Instinct" (2000)
 "Come On Feet" (2000)
 "Astronaut" (2002)
 "Broad Factor" (2004)
 "Bus Ride" (2005)
 "The Front / Youngblood" (2005)
 "Bullysh!t/Seasons Change" (2005)

References

External links
 Stones Throw Records: Quasimoto

Madlib
Fictional rappers
Stones Throw Records artists
Fictional characters invented for recorded music
Fictional duos